

Events

January events
 January 16 – The permanent London Paddington station, designed by Isambard Kingdom Brunel for the Great Western Railway of England, is opened.
 January 20 – The North Carolina General Assembly in the United States charters the Atlantic and North Carolina Railroad to run from Goldsboro through New Bern to the newly created seaport of Morehead City near Beaufort.

February events
 February 15 – Pennsylvania Railroad's Horseshoe Curve near Altoona, Pennsylvania, opens for railroad traffic.
 February 22 – Chicago & Rock Island Railroad opens throughout to Rock Island, Illinois, making it the first railroad to connect Chicago with the Mississippi River.

April events

May events
 May 15 – Opening of railway over the Semmering Pass in Austria.

June events
 1 June – Birmingham New Street station is opened in Birmingham, England.
 June – The Grand Excursion takes prominent Eastern United States inhabitants from Chicago to Rock Island, Illinois, by railroad, then up the Mississippi River to St. Paul, Minnesota, by steamboat.

July events
 July 1 – The Harcourt Street railway line opens between Dublin and Bray, Ireland.
 July 3 – The Brooklyn City Railroad, the oldest streetcar line in Brooklyn, New York, opens for passenger service.

August events 
 August 12 – The first section of what is now Belgian railway line 161 opens connecting Brussels-Luxembourg and La Hulpe stations.
 August 15 – First section of East Indian Railway opens, from Howrah to Hooghly (37 km).
 August 20 – The first trains operate in what is now Romania between Oraviţa, Transylvania, and Baziaş, on the Danube.
 August 21 – The Great Western Railway of Canada opens its Galt Branch.
 August 28 – The Somerset Central Railway opens and is leased to the Bristol and Exeter Railway for a seven-year term.

September events
 September 1 – Opening of first railway in Norway, the Hovedjernbanen, from Christiania (Oslo) to Eidsvoll (67.6 km).
 September 12 – Opening of first steam railway in Australia, the Melbourne and Hobson's Bay Railway Company's Port Melbourne line, from Melbourne Terminus to Sandridge on  gauge.
 September 20 – The Great North of Scotland Railway operates its first passenger train over the  route from Kittybrewster, in Aberdeen, to Huntly.

October events
 October 20 – Kingston Locomotive Works, the predecessor of the Canadian Locomotive Company, completes construction of its first steam locomotive.
 October 25 – The Carillon and Grenville Railway, in Canada, opens.

November events
 November 13 – Opening London Necropolis railway station at Waterloo, London, a special railway station constructed by the London Necropolis Company for funeral trains.

Unknown date events
 Opening of first section of railway in Africa, the Middle East and the Ottoman Empire, between Alexandria and Kafr el-Zayyat in Egypt.
 Aretas Blood purchases the steam locomotive manufacturing business of Amoskeag Locomotive Works and folds it into Manchester Locomotive Works.
 Henry Farnam becomes president of the Chicago, Rock Island and Pacific Railroad.

Births

January births
 January 6 – William N. Page, American civil engineer, builder of the Chesapeake and Ohio Railway and the Virginian Railway (d. 1932).

February births 
 February 14 – Job A. Edson, president of Kansas City Southern Railway 1905–1918 and 1920–1927 (d. 1928).

December births 
 December 26 – Charles Frederick Crocker, son of Charles Crocker of California's Big Four railroaders, president of San Joaquin and Sierra Nevada Railroad, vice president of Southern Pacific Railroad (d. 1897).

Deaths

February deaths
 February 19 – Whitmell P. Tunstall, first president of the Richmond and Danville Railroad (b. 1810).

References
 Colin Churcher's Railway Pages (August 16, 2005), Significant dates in Canadian railway history. Retrieved October 25, 2005.
 (April 3, 2005), Significant dates in Canadian railway history. Retrieved August 16, 2005.